is an airport located  west southwest of Matsuyama, Ehime, Japan.

History

The airport opened as an Imperial Japanese Navy airfield in 1941. At the end of the war it served as the base for the 353th Fighter Squadron which defended against B-29s' raid. The airport then became under the administration of the British Commonwealth Occupation Force and became a country-administered civil airport in 1952. During the Korean War, the airport was used by the US and British Military. It was the first airport in Shikoku to see jet service following a runway extension project in 1972.

An office park named "Biz Port" opened near the airport in 2003 to attract technology businesses, but is scheduled to close on 1 April 2015.

In 2013, the government of Ehime Prefecture and local business organizations announced that they would begin subsidizing the airport's international routes to Shanghai and Seoul, which had seen load factors of less than 50% in June 2013.

All international service at the airport was suspended in 2020 due to the COVID-19 pandemic. International service resumed in December 2022 with a VietJet charter flight bringing tourists from Ho Chi Minh City.

Resumption of charter flights between Matsuyama Airport and Taipei Songshan Airport are expected to be resumed in February 2023.

Accidents and incidents

 On 13 November 1966, All Nippon Airways Flight 533 crashed in the sea just few miles away from the airport, killing all 50 people on board. The cause was never determined. On this occasion, airport authorities across the country start planning a runway extension project and installation of aeronautical navigation systems including ILS on every Japanese airports.
On 26 October 2013, a small propeller aircraft inbound from Kikai Airport crash-landed on the runway at around 6:30 p.m., forcing a temporary closure of the airport.

Airlines and destinations

Statistics

References

Airports in Japan
Transport in Ehime Prefecture
Buildings and structures in Ehime Prefecture
Matsuyama, Ehime
Airports established in 1941
1941 establishments in Japan